The Abilene Fire Station No. 2, at 441 Butternut in Abilene, Texas, was built in 1926.  It was listed on the National Register of Historic Places in 1992.

It was deemed to be "Abilene's best and least altered example of a local government building. It is the city's only fire station that retains its integrity and stands as a vivid reminder of municipal efforts to provide basic services for local residents."

References

Fire stations on the National Register of Historic Places in Texas
National Register of Historic Places in Taylor County, Texas

Buildings and structures completed in 1926